John Scott Kirby (born August 13, 1967) is an American executive currently serving as CEO of United Airlines. He previously served as President of US Airways and American Airlines, as well as President of United Airlines from 2016 to 2020, when he was promoted as CEO.

Early life and education
Kirby was raised as the oldest of six children in Rowlett, Texas. In high school, he played baseball and football, and had aspirations of becoming a professional athlete. He received his bachelor's degree in computer science and operations research from the United States Air Force Academy, where he trained to be an aircraft pilot, in 1989. He later earned his Master of Science degree in operations research at George Washington University.

Career
Early in his career, Kirby worked at The Pentagon as a budget analyst for the United States Secretary of Defense for three years.  He later worked for Sabre Decision Technologies (SDT), a subsidiary of AMR Corporation within the tourism and transport industries.

Kirby joined America West Airlines in 1995, initially serving as a senior director of scheduling and planning, and later as vice president of planning (1997), vice president of revenue management (1998), senior vice president of the company's computer program system (2000), and executive vice president. Kirby began serving as president of US Airways in September 2006, after the two airlines merged in 2005. He led US Airways' team for planning the merger.  He also oversaw daily operations as well as marketing and sales strategies in his role as president. Kirby became president of American Airlines after the company merged with US Airways in 2013. He and American Airlines chief executive officer (CEO) Doug Parker worked closely together at America West, US Airways, and American.

Kirby became president of United Airlines in August 2016. He was announced as the successor to the CEO role in December 2019, following Oscar Munoz; his tenure started in May 2020. Kirby has been credited with expanding the airline's flight network, and restructuring hubs in Chicago, Denver, and Houston.

In December 2020, Kirby was elected as chairman of the Star Alliance Chief Executive Board (CEB), succeeding former chairman Pedro Heilbron.

In August 2021, Kirby told Axios about his decision to mandate all United employees to get the COVID-19 vaccine, saying he's had dozens of employees die from COVID "and 100% of them are unvaccinated."

Personal life
Kirby is married and has seven children. He has four daughters: Brittany, Madison, Alexandra and Scarlett; and three sons: Sean, James, and Logan. He has donated money to both Republican and Democratic politicians, and donated to Steve Bullock's Presidential campaign in 2020.

References

External links
 J Scott Kirby at Bloomberg.com
 One-on-one with United president Scott Kirby (March 31, 2019) by Chris McGinnis, San Francisco Chronicle

Living people
George Washington University alumni
1967 births
American airline chief executives
American Airlines people
United Airlines people
United States Air Force Academy alumni